Milly Johnson is a British author of romantic fiction. She has written 20 best-selling novels with over three million sales worldwide, one book of poetry, and 5 novellas. She was nominated for the Melissa Nathan award for Romantic comedy in 2012, winner of the RoNA Award for Comedy Romance in 2014 and 2016 and Winner of Channel 4's Come Dine With Me – Barnsley edition. She was honoured with the Romantic Novelist Association's Outstanding Achievement Award in 2020. She is also an after-dinner speaker, poet, professional joke writer, short-story writer and newspaper columnist.

Biography
Born in Barnsley on 23 February 1964.

She was an avid reader and writer of stories from a very young age and was strongly influenced by the works of Enid Blyton, the Brontë sisters, Jane Austen, Catherine Cookson, Stan Barstow and Barry Hines, who also gave Johnson a great love of birds and she regularly flies birds of prey at the Falconry Centre in Thirsk. She was educated at Agnes Road Primary School, Longcar Junior School and Hall Balk School for Girls. At university she studied drama and teacher training at St Luke's Campus, University of Exeter.

She lived in Haworth, West Yorkshire for many years where she became a friend of Stan Barstow, who also lived there. She had a series of administrative jobs whilst writing jokes and poems for the greetings card market to supplement her income and became a ghostwriter on Purple Ronnie in its earliest days. Later, she was to become one of the country's leading professional copywriters for the greetings card market.

She had her first child in 1998, being pregnant at the same time as two of her best friends. When she sent off to an agent the idea for a book about three Yorkshire women who fall pregnant at the same time, based on her own experience of joining "the club" of women experienced with having babies, and the experiences derived from her parentcraft classes, she secured her first two-book deal with Simon and Schuster in 2004 when she was forty.

Books

Her first novel was The Yorkshire Pudding Club in 2007, and her first hardback release was The Perfectly Imperfect Woman in 2018.

Johnson also released four shorter novellas exclusive to ebook: The Wedding Dress, a collection of short stories related to weddings (2012) and Here Come the Boys (2014) inspired by Johnson and her family missing a cruise ship two years previously. Ladies Who Launch was written in 2015 as both a sequel to Here Come The Boys and an introduction to Afternoon Tea at the Sunflower Cafe. She released the 16,000 short story ebook The Barn on Half Moon Hill in May 2016 to raise funds for the Care for Claire fund to raise money for Claire Throssell, whose children were killed in a murder/suicide by their father. In 2019, she released a book of poetry A Cat-Shaped Space, the profits of which are all donated to Yorkshire Cat Rescue. In 2020 she also wrote a novella 'The Little Dreams of Lara Cliffe' for the resurrected 'Quick Reads' project to encourage adult reading.

Awards and honours

Johnson's books are published all over the world, in print, ebook, large print and audio form.  
2014 – Romantic Novelists’ Comedy Award for It's Raining Men.
2015 – Yorkshire Society Award for Arts and Culture.
2015 – nominated for the Romantic Novelists' Comedy Award for Teashop on the Corner.
2016 – Romantic Novelists' Comedy Award for Afternoon Tea at the Sunflower Cafe.
2017 – nominated for the Romantic Novelists' Contemporary Award for Queen of Wishful Thinking.
2018 —  Vice President of the Yorkshire Society.
2020 — RNA Outstanding Achievement Award
2021 – The Golsboro Books Award for Romantic Contemporary Fiction for My One True North.

List of books 
The Yorkshire Pudding Club (2007)
The Birds and the Bees (2008)
A Spring Affair (2009)
A Summer Fling (2010)
Here Come The Girls (2011)
An Autumn Crush (2011)
White Wedding (2012)
A Winter Flame (2012)
It's Raining Men (2013)
The Teashop on the Corner (2014)
Afternoon Tea at the Sunflower Cafe (2015)
Sunshine over Wildflower Cottage (2016)
Queen of Wishful Thinking (2017)
The Perfectly Imperfect Woman (2018)
The Mother of All Christmases (2018)
The Magnificent Mrs Mayhew (2019) 
A Cat-Shaped Space (2019) (a book of poetry)
The Little Dreams of Lara Cliffe (2020)
My One True North (2020)
I Wish It Could Be Christmas Every Day (2020)
The Woman in the Middle (2021)
Together, Again (2023)

Ebook exclusives
The Wedding Dress (2012)
The Four Seasons Collection – a compilation of the Spring, Summer, Autumn and Winter books (2013) 
Here Come The Boys (2014)
Ladies Who Launch (2015)
The Barn on Half Moon Hill (2016)

References

External links and articles

The Milly Johnson Website
Milly Johnson’s Blog
"A Passion for Men in Tights" – Yorkshire Post
"Driven to Success by Workplace Bullying" – Sunday Post

1964 births
Living people
British romantic fiction writers